Andrea Sestini Hlaváčková and Peng Shuai were the defending champions, but Sestini Hlaváčková chose to compete in Brisbane instead and Peng chose not to participate this year.

Irina-Camelia Begu and Simona Halep won the title, defeating Barbora Krejčíková and Kateřina Siniaková in the final, 1–6, 6–1, [10–8].

Seeds

Draw

References
 Draw

WTA Shenzhen Open
2018 Doubles